The Azerbaijan Cup 2001–02 was the 11th season of the annual cup competition in Azerbaijan with the final taking place on 28 May 2002. Sixteen teams competed in this year's competition. Shafa Baku were the defending champions.

First round 
The first legs were played on October 18, 2001 and the second legs on November 1, 2001.

|}

Round of 16
The first legs were played on November 14, 2001 and the second legs on November 28, 2001.

|}

Quarterfinals 
The first legs were played on April 9, 2002 and the second legs on May 11, 2002.

|}

Semifinals 
The first legs were played on May 19, 2002 and the second legs on May 22, 2002.

|}

Final 
Shamkir walked off in the 84th minute following a penalty award against them. Neftci were declared winners.

References

External links
Azerbaijan Cup
Azerbaijan Cup '02 RSSSF

Azerbaijan Cup seasons
Cup
Azerbaijan Cup